Ljussens is a village in Noardeast-Fryslân in the province of Friesland, the Netherlands. It had a population of around 348 in January 2017. Before 2019, the village was part of the Dongeradeel municipality.

The village was first mentioned in 1401 as Luscens, and means "people of Liusse (Liutfrid)". The Dutch Reformed church dates from the 13th century. Around 1480, it was enlarged and received a five-sided choir. In 1840, Ljussens was home to 439 people.

Gallery

References

External links

Noardeast-Fryslân
Populated places in Friesland